Union Sportive Vimy is a French football club located in Vimy, France.

History 
US Vimy was founded in 1932, and spent most of their history in amateur and semi-pro leagues in France. They were promoted into the Championnat National 3 for the first time in their history for the 2019–20 season.

Colours and badge 
The club colours are sky blue.

Current squad

Honours
Régional 1: 2018-19

References

External links 
 Official Website
 Soccerway Profile
 FFF Profile

Football clubs in France
Association football clubs established in 1932
1932 establishments in France
Sport in Pas-de-Calais
Football clubs in Hauts-de-France